The Eagles Nest Wilderness is a U.S. Wilderness Area located in the Gore Range near Vail, Copper Mountain, Frisco, Silverthorne, and Heeney, in Summit and Eagle Counties, Colorado. Eagles Nest Wilderness falls within the jurisdiction of Dillon Ranger District and Holy Cross Ranger District, White River National Forest. In 2010, additional lands were proposed for wilderness protection under the Hidden Gems proposal, affecting Elliot Ridge, Tenmile, and Lower Piney areas of Summit and Eagle Counties.

The Eagles Nest Wilderness lies in the southern area of the Gore Range of mountains. The Gore Range was named in honor of Sir George Gore arising from a hunting expedition led by Jim Bridger (1804–1881), an early trapper and explorer of the Rocky Mountains. In 1854, Sir George Gore hired Bridger as a hunting guide out of Fort Leavenworth, Kansas. The Gore expedition traveled through the central Colorado mountain range before heading north into the Yellowstone area. Gore practiced a policy of heavy treading on the land, hauling 30 wagons and more than 50 servants on his expedition of 6,000 miles. Gore shot thousands of large game animals during his guided tour of the mountains that extended into 1855.

Subsequently, the Gore Range became a site of interest to miners seeking gold and silver during the latter half of the nineteenth century.  Many mine tailings and shallow digs exist throughout the Gore Range, including the former Boss Mine ruins along the Rock Creek Trail. The earliest rumors of gold in the area were based on trading with the local Ute people.  Then, a member of the Gore expedition discovered gold in the area surrounding Piney Lake, near the present Upper Piney Lake Trail north of Vail.  Lemuel Pollard, a member of the Bela M. Hughes party, discovered gold when passing through the Gore Range.  Numerous other gold seekers left the slopes of the Gore Range pock-marked with diggings that remain part of the features of the landscape within the forest.

Hiking trails within the Eagles Nest Wilderness Area include Gore Range Trail, Buffalo Mountain Trail, South Willow Creek Trail, Rock Creek Trail, Cataract Lake Loop Trail, Mirror Lake Trail, Eaglesmere Lakes Trail, Tipperary Lake Trail, Salmon Willow Trail, Meadow Creek Trail, North Tenmile Creek Trail, Gore Creek Trail, Deluge Lake Trail, Booth Creek Trail, Upper Piney Lake Trail, Pitkin Creek Trail, Elliot Ridge Trail, and Wheeler Lakes Trail.

References

External links

 
Wilderness areas of Colorado
White River National Forest
Protected areas established in 1978
Protected areas of Eagle County, Colorado
Protected areas of Summit County, Colorado